Jan Działyński (1590–1648) of Gozdawa coat of arms was a Polish–Lithuanian Commonwealth noble and politician. Member of the Działyński family. Starost pokrzywnicki, of Puck and Kowalewo Pomorskie. Voivode of Chełmno (1647–1648).

Deputy to Sejm, notable politician from Royal Prussia. Critic of Gdańsk (Danzig), defender of Catholic faith, founder of the collegium in Grudziądz. Known to have been engaged in several court proceedings with various other nobles and even peasants.

Married twice; he had no children.

1590 births
1648 deaths
Jan